Doug Draizin is an American producer known for films such as Fools Rush In (1997 film), Spy Hard and Safety Patrol (film). He is a graduate of New York Institute of Technology. Draizin is Jewish.

References

External links

Year of birth missing (living people)
Living people
New York Institute of Technology alumni
American film producers
Place of birth missing (living people)
American Jews